Transient lingual papillitis  are painful, hypertrophic, red and white lingual papillae on the tongue.

Cause 
Transient lingual papillitis can affect males and females as early as 3 years of age. In many cases, the cause is unknown. Some dental professionals believe the inflammation is due to chronic irritation from teeth, fillings, or dental appliances. Stress, poor nutrition, smoking, eating too much sugar, and alcohol use may also be initiating factors.

References

Tongue
[[C